The Fourth Federal Electoral District of Yucatán (IV Distrito Electoral Federal de Yucatán) is one of the 300 Electoral Districts into which Mexico is divided for the purpose of elections to the federal Chamber of Deputies and one of five such districts in the state of Yucatán.

It elects one deputy to the lower house of Congress for each three-year legislative period, by means of the first past the post system.

District territory
Under the 2005 districting scheme, the district covers the south-eastern portion of the municipality of Mérida.

The district's head town (cabecera distrital), where results from individual polling stations are gathered together and collated, is the state capital, the city of Mérida.

Previous districting schemes

1996–2005 district
Between 1996 and 2005, Yucatán's Fourth  District covered the eastern portion of the Mérida Municipality.

Deputies returned to Congress from this district

LI Legislature
 1979–1982: Roger Milton Rubio Madera (PRI)
LII Legislature
 1982–1985: Dulce María Sauri Riancho (PRI)
LIII Legislature
 1985–1988:
LIV Legislature
 1988–1991: Eric Rubio Barthell (PRI)
LV Legislature
 1991–1994:
LVI Legislature
 1994–1997: Tuffy Gaber Arjona (PRI)
LVII Legislature
 1997–2000:
LVIII Legislature
 2000–2003: Miguel Ángel Gutiérrez Machado (PAN)
LIX Legislature
 2003–2006: Virginia Baeza Estrella (PAN)
LX Legislature
 2006–2009: Edgar Ramírez Pech (PAN)

References and notes

Federal electoral districts of Mexico
Geography of Yucatán